The following events occurred in September 1937:

September 1, 1937 (Wednesday)
The Battle of Taiyuan began for control of the capital of Shanxi Province.
The Nationalists launched the Asturias Offensive on the northern front.
The musical film The Firefly starring Jeanette MacDonald and Allan Jones premiered at the Astor Theatre in New York City.

September 2, 1937 (Thursday)
The Great Hong Kong typhoon killed 11,000 people.
Hermann Göring warned in a speech in Stuttgart that if a new boycott of Nazi Germany was attempted, "any damages caused will be paid by Jews in Germany."
The adventure film The Prisoner of Zenda starring Ronald Colman, Madeleine Carroll and Douglas Fairbanks, Jr. was released.
Born: Len Carlson, voice actor, in Edmonton, Alberta, Canada (d. 2006)
Died: Pierre de Coubertin, 74, French educator, historian and founder of the International Olympic Committee

September 3, 1937 (Friday)
Congress of Industrial Organizations leader John L. Lewis gave a radio address broadcast across the United States in which he attacked the Roosevelt Administration for professing impartiality in the country's labor disputes instead of supporting the workers. Lewis brought up the prospect of creating a farmer-labor third party movement.
Another Soviet merchant ship, the Blagoev, was attacked near Greece and sunk in the Mediterranean.

September 4, 1937 (Saturday)
The press of the Soviet Union blamed the August 30 sinking of the Timiryazev on Italy. "The government will make the Fascist bandits pay dearly", declared Pravda. 
The Japanese puppet state known as the South Chahar Autonomous Government was established in Zhangjiakou.
Born: Dawn Fraser, swimmer and politician, in Balmain, New South Wales, Australia; Mikk Mikiver, actor and theater director, in Tallinn, Estonia (d. 2006)

September 5, 1937 (Sunday)
Llanes fell to the Nationalists.
The Argentine presidential election was held, resulting in the election of Roberto María Ortiz.
Japan established a naval blockade spanning the entire Chinese coastline with the exception of ports where foreign powers had treaty rights.
Born: William Devane, actor, in Albany, New York

September 6, 1937 (Monday)
The Battle of El Mazuco began in the north.
Italy denied responsibility for the sinking of the Timiryazev and Blagoev.
Born: Sergio Aragonés, cartoonist, in Sant Mateu, Spain; Kirtanananda Swami, Hare Krishna guru, in Peekskill, New York (d. 2011); Jo Anne Worley, actress, in Lowell, Indiana
Died: Henry Kimball Hadley, 65, American composer and conductor

September 7, 1937 (Tuesday)
The Zaragoza Offensive ended in Republican failure.
The Battle of Belchite ended in a tactical Republican victory.
The Battle of Cape Cherchell was fought.
A manifesto written by Hitler was read by Adolf Wagner at the Nuremberg Rally, offering to stand beside Italy and Japan in a "defensive fight" against communism.
The first winners of the new German National Prize for Art and Science were announced.
Born: Cüneyt Arkın, actor, director and producer, in Gökçeoğlu, Eskişehir Province, Turkey
Died: Annie Lorrain Smith, 82, British lichenologist and mycologist

September 8, 1937 (Wednesday)
Italy announced it would not be attending the upcoming Nyon Conference on Mediterranean piracy due to the Soviet Union's demands on Italy for satisfaction. Germany would not be participating either.
Bloudan Conference: A Pan-Arab conference of 400 unofficial delegates in Bloudan rejected the Peel Commission report recommending partition of Palestine.

September 9, 1937 (Thursday)
Hitler laid the cornerstone for the Deutsches Stadion. Like many major Nazi construction projects it would never be completed.

September 10, 1937 (Friday)
The Nyon Conference began in Nyon, Switzerland, aiming to address attacks on international shipping in the Mediterranean during the Spanish Civil War.
Born: Jared Diamond, American geographer, historian, and author, in Boston

September 11, 1937 (Saturday)
President Roosevelt gave a press conference in New York vowing he would do everything possible "to keep us out of war."
Bette Cooper of New Jersey won the 11th Miss America beauty pageant.
Born: Queen Paola of Belgium, in Forte dei Marmi, Italy 
Died: Nazmi Ziya Güran, 56 or 57, Turkish Impressionist painter

September 12, 1937 (Sunday)
Excerpts from a letter written by the imprisoned German pastor Martin Niemöller were read to his congregation. "I often think of others who must wander through the same dark valley as myself", one passage read. "But it is a comfort to us all to know that you are praying for us. I am certain the almighty God will triumph."
Rudolf Caracciola of Germany won the Italian Grand Prix.

September 13, 1937 (Monday)
The Battle of Xinkou began.
Heinrich Himmler decreed that Jews could be released from "protective custody" in concentration camps if they provided evidence that they were emigrating.
Japanese forces captured Datong.
The Chinese government made a formal appeal to the League of Nations to take action against Japan.
In his final address on the closing day of the Nuremberg Rally, Hitler declared that the failure of Franco's Nationalists would "upset the balance of power in Europe, which is of vital importance to Germany."
Born: Don Bluth, American animator and film director, former animator at Disney from 1955 to 1979, founder of Sullivan Bluth Studios, co-founder of 20th Century Fox Animation and co-creator of An American Tail, The Land Before Time and Anastasia.
Died: Ellis Parker Butler, 67, American author

September 14, 1937 (Tuesday)
The Nyon Conference ended with an agreement to establish a system of patrol zones, with the British and French assuming the most responsibility. It was agreed that submarines that attacked merchant vessels could be attacked in return by the patrols.
Died: Tomáš Garrigue Masaryk, 87, 1st President of Czechoslovakia

September 15, 1937 (Wednesday)
Hitler's half-brother Alois opened a café in Berlin.
Born: King Curtis Iaukea, professional wrestler, in Honolulu, Hawaii (d. 2010); Robert Lucas, Jr., economist and Nobel laureate, in Yakima, Washington; Fernando de la Rúa, President of Argentina, in Córdoba, Argentina (d. 2019).

September 16, 1937 (Thursday)
The NAACP sent a telegram to President Roosevelt urging that he call upon Hugo Black to resign from the Supreme Court or "take other appropriate action in the absence of repudiation and disproof of the charges by Senator Black to relieve himself and the nation of the embarrassment of having upon the highest court a man pledged to uphold principles inimical to true Americanism."
The British historical film Victoria the Great starring Anna Neagle premiered in London. 
Born: Jesse J. McCrary, Jr., lawyer and civil rights activist, in Blitchton, Florida (d. 2007)

September 17, 1937 (Friday)
The Battle of Santander ended in a decisive Nationalist victory.
The Nyon agreement was expanded to include aircraft as legitimate targets for reprisal attacks by patrol ships.
The Abraham Lincoln head on the Mount Rushmore sculpture was dedicated.
Born: Orlando Cepeda, baseball player, in Ponce, Puerto Rico; Ilarion Ionescu-Galați, violinist and conductor, in Iași, Romania

September 18, 1937 (Saturday)
Spanish Prime Minister Juan Negrín spoke before the Assembly at the League of Nations, calling the Spanish Civil War "a war of invasion" and denouncing Hitler and Mussolini as "international highwaymen." Negrín called on the League to recognize German and Italian aggression, give the Republic the right to freely procure war materiel and have all foreign combatants withdrawn from Spanish territory.
The Alliance of Democrats formed in Poland.

September 19, 1937 (Sunday)
The Folsom escape attempt occurred. Two of the seven prisoners trying to escape were shot dead; the other five were sentenced to death and eventually executed.
Hockey Club Ambrì-Piotta was founded in Switzerland.
Born: Abner Haynes, AFL running back, in Denton, Texas

September 20, 1937 (Monday)
Anthony Eden spoke at the League of Nations Assembly, telling Italy and Japan they were ruining themselves financially by their policies of territorial conquest and informing Germany that the way to obtain raw materials was to buy them instead of demanding colonies.
Spain failed to get the two-thirds majority it needed to get re-elected onto the League of Nations council. The Latin American countries no longer supported the Spanish Republic because they had shifted their support to Franco.
Died: Henry Denhardt, 61, American politician (shot); Lev Karakhan, 48, Soviet revolutionary and diplomat (killed in the Great Purge); Harry Stovey, 80, American baseball player; Felix M. Warburg, 66, German-born American banker

September 21, 1937 (Tuesday)
21 Japanese warplanes bombed the city of Canton for 90 minutes, killing many civilians.
Italy reversed itself and agreed in principle to participate in the patrolling of the Mediterranean.
The J. R. R. Tolkien children's fantasy novel The Hobbit was published in England.
Died: Osgood Perkins, 45, American actor

September 22, 1937 (Wednesday)
The Battle of El Mazuco ended in a Nationalist victory.
Japan's apology for the August 26 airplane attack on ambassador Hughe Knatchbull-Hugessen was made public by Britain and the matter was declared closed.
Died: Ruth Roland, 45, American actress and film producer (cancer)

September 23, 1937 (Thursday)
The New York Yankees won the American League pennant when the Detroit Tigers were eliminated in a 4–3 loss to the Boston Red Sox.
Benito Mussolini's second son Vittorio arrived in the United States to study filmmaking methods in Hollywood with the producer Hal Roach.
The professional wrestling event known as the EMLL 4th Anniversary Show took place in Mexico City.
Born: Martin Litchfield West, scholar of classical antiquity, in London, England (d. 2015)

September 24, 1937 (Friday)
The Battle of Pingxingguan began.
The Japanese occupied Baoding.

September 25, 1937 (Saturday)
The Battle of Pingxingguan ended in Chinese victory.
Benito Mussolini arrived in Munich on the first day of a five-day official visit to Germany.
Geelong defeated Collingwood in the VFL Grand Final.
Born: Freeman Patterson, nature photographer and writer, in Long Reach, New Brunswick, Canada

September 26, 1937 (Sunday)
British District Commissioner for the Galilee Lewis Yelland Andrews and his bodyguard were gunned down in Nazareth.
The Storstrøm Bridge, one of the longest in Europe, was inaugurated in Denmark by King Christian X.
Died: Bessie Smith, 43, American blues singer (car accident)

September 27, 1937 (Monday)
British authorities arrested 120 suspects in the Lewis Yelland Andrews murder.
Italy signed on to the Nyon accords.

September 28, 1937 (Tuesday)
Hitler and Mussolini spoke at a rally in Berlin that was heard by millions around the world in a radio broadcast. Hitler went first and spoke of the "common ideals and interests inspiring Italy and Germany." Mussolini, delivering his speech in German, made the first official acknowledgement that Italy had troops in Spain when he said, "Where words are insufficient to carry on the fight we turn to weapons. We have done this in Spain, where thousands of Italian Fascist volunteers have lost their lives."
At the League of Nations, Britain and France balked at Spain's demand to condemn Germany and Italy as aggressors and allow arms exports to the Spanish government, fearing it would worsen the general situation in Europe.
The League of Nations officially condemned the Japanese bombing of Chinese cities.
President Roosevelt dedicated the Bonneville Dam in the Columbia River Gorge.
Born: Rod Roddy, radio and television announcer, in Fort Worth, Texas (d. 2003)

September 29, 1937 (Wednesday)
Chiang Kai-shek and Mao Zedong agreed to put aside their differences and join forces to fight the Japanese invasion.
Purdy Bridge opened in Purdy, Washington.
Died: Ray Ewry, 63, American track and field athlete

September 30, 1937 (Thursday)
The League of Nations drafted a resolution warning that if Italy did not withdraw its troops from Spain, the League would "consider ending the policy" of nonintervention.
The New York Giants clinched the National League pennant with a 2–1 victory over the Philadelphia Phillies. The 1937 World Series would be a rematch of 1936.

References

1937
1937-09
1937-09